José Alberto Fogaça de Medeiros (born 1947) is a Brazilian politician who has been the Mayor of Porto Alegre, Brazil, a state deputy, federal deputy and senator.

He is a graduate of the Catholic University of Rio Grande do Sul and taught at the College of Rio Grande, before becoming a TV and print journalist.

He is a member of the PMDB, having been elected in 2004 as mayor on behalf of the Socialist People's Party.  He has pledged to continue the participatory budgeting system introduced under the PT  and his mandate expires in 2008.

He is married to the singer Isabela Fogaça.

Political career
1979-1982: State Deputy, Rio Grande do Sul
1983-1986: Federal Deputy, Chamber of Deputies of Brazil
1987-2003: Senator, Senate of Brazil
2005-2009: Mayor of Porto Alegre

He is longlisted for the 2008 World Mayor award.

See also
 List of mayors of Porto Alegre
 Timeline of Porto Alegre

References

External links
 CityMayors profile
 Discussion of 2004 election result

1947 births
Living people
Mayors of Porto Alegre
Brazilian Democratic Movement politicians
Cidadania politicians
Members of the Chamber of Deputies (Brazil) from Rio Grande do Sul
Members of the Federal Senate (Brazil)
Pontifical Catholic University of Rio Grande do Sul alumni
Members of the Legislative Assembly of Rio Grande do Sul